Events from the year 1945 in the United Kingdom. This year sees the end of World War II and a landslide general election victory for the Labour Party.

Incumbents
 Monarch – George VI
 Prime Minister - Winston Churchill (Coalition) (until 26 July), Clement Attlee (Labour) (starting 26 July)
 Parliament
 37th (until 15 June)
 38th (starting 1 August)

Events
 2 January – General Bernard Montgomery holds a press conference at Zonhoven describing his contribution to the Battle of the Bulge.
 23 January – announcement of the establishment of the Industrial and Commercial Finance Corporation (ICFC; predecessor of 3i) by the Bank of England and the major commercial banks to provide long-term investment funding for small and medium-sized enterprises.
 4 February – Prime Minister Winston Churchill attends the Yalta Conference (ends 11 February).
 13 February – the RAF Bomber Command begins the strategic bombing of Dresden in Saxony, Germany, resulting in a lethal firestorm which kills tens of thousands of civilians.
 10 March – sixty-seven German prisoners of war tunnel their way out of Island Farm Camp 198 at Bridgend, the biggest escape attempt by German POWs in the UK during the War.
 14 March – the RAF uses the Grand Slam bomb for the first time on the Bielefeld railway viaduct.
 17 March – 13 people are killed and 22 injured when a lone Heinkel 111 bomber opens fire and drops bombs on people leaving a cinema in Kingston upon Hull. 
 27 March – last day of V-2 rocket attacks aimed at the UK. One hits Hughes Mansions, Stepney in East London, killing 134 and the last falls in Orpington with one fatality.
 29 March – the last V-1 flying bomb attack on the UK takes place. The last enemy action of any kind on British soil occurs when one strikes Datchworth in Hertfordshire without any fatalities or injuries.
 13 April – the first Scottish National Party Member of Parliament, Robert McIntyre, is elected to the Parliament of the United Kingdom after his victory at the Motherwell by-election.
 15 April – British troops liberate the Bergen-Belsen concentration camp; Richard Dimbleby reports on it for the BBC.
 19 April – Geoffrey Fisher enthroned as Archbishop of Canterbury.
 April – Sybil Campbell is appointed a stipendiary magistrate in London, the first woman to become a professional judge in the UK.

 8 May – eight days after the suicide of Adolf Hitler and the collapse of the Nazi rule in Berlin, V-E Day is celebrated throughout the UK. Prime Minister Winston Churchill makes a victory speech and appears on the balcony of Buckingham Palace with George VI, Queen Elizabeth and Princesses Elizabeth and Margaret. Street parties take place throughout the country.
 9 May – German forces in the Channel Islands, the only occupied part of the British Isles, surrender.
 23 May – Churchill forms a "caretaker" Conservative Party administration, pending an election, officially ending the wartime Coalition government.
 28 May – American-born Irish-raised William Joyce, known as "Lord Haw-Haw" is captured on the German border. He is later charged with high treason in London for his English-language wartime propaganda broadcasts on German radio. He is hanged in January 1946.
 1 June – the UK takes over administration of Lebanon and Syria.
 4 June – Churchill, in a broadcast election speech, claims that a future socialist government "would have to fall back on some form of Gestapo".
 7 June – Benjamin Britten opera Peter Grimes is first performed at Sadler's Wells Theatre in London with Peter Pears in the title role.
 13 June – Council for the Encouragement of Music and the Arts renamed Arts Council of Great Britain.
 15 June – Parliament passes the Family Allowances Act to provide payments to families with children.
 18 June – the demobilisation of the wartime armed forces begins.
 5 July – polling day for the first general election to be held since 1935; a few constituencies delay polling due to local Wakes weeks and the vote count is not made for another three weeks (see below) so that votes from the servicemen overseas can be added to the total.
 17 July – Potsdam Conference – the three main Allied leaders begin their final summit of the war. The meeting will end on 2 August.

 26 July – general election results are announced; Winston Churchill resigns as prime minister after his Conservative Party is soundly defeated by the Labour Party, who have a majority of 146 seats, and Clement Attlee becomes the new Prime Minister. However, Churchill will remain as Leader of the Conservative Party, in opposition. It will be the first time that a Labour government with a majority in the House of Commons has governed Britain. Among the new Labour members of parliament is 29-year-old Harold Wilson, MP for Ormskirk in Lancashire, who will become the next Labour Prime Minister in 1964. A notable casualty of the election is Harold Macmillan, who has now lost the Stockton-on-Tees seat twice for the Conservative Party. Ernest Brown, leader of the National Liberal Party, loses his seat at Leith to Labour and Sir Archibald Sinclair, leader of the Liberal Party, comes third in the poll at Caithness and Sutherland, while their parties are reduced to 11 and 12 seats respectively. Robert McIntyre loses his newly won  Scottish National Party seat. On 27 July, Alfred Dobbs, newly elected as Labour MP for Smethwick, near Birmingham, is killed in a car crash.
 29 July – the BBC Light Programme radio station is launched, concentrating on the broadcasting of mainstream light music and entertainment, superseding the BBC General Forces Programme within the UK using its longwave frequency from the Droitwich Transmitting Station.
 2 August - Clement Davies replaces Sir Archibald Sinclair as leader of the Liberal Party.
 5 August – the Giles family cartoon first appears in the Sunday Express.
 13 August – Zionist World Congress approaches the British government to talk about the establishment of the state of Israel.
 14 August
 The 1945 Prime Minister's Resignation Honours are announced, to mark the resignation of Winston Churchill.
 Polish-Jewish orphans liberated from Theresienstadt concentration camp arrive in England for rehabilitation.
 Late this evening, the new Prime Minister, Clement Attlee, and his Foreign Secretary, Ernest Bevin, broadcast news of the surrender of Japan to the nation and Empire, speaking from 10 Downing Street.
 15 August – V-J Day is celebrated in the UK as the first of two days of national holiday, marking the end of World War II.
 16 August – in the House of Commons, Leader of the Opposition Winston Churchill speaks of an "Iron Curtain" descending across Europe.
 17 August – George Orwell's political allegory Animal Farm is published.
 30 August – British sovereignty of Hong Kong restored following the end of the Japanese occupation of the territory.
 2 September
 Press censorship ends.
 Lend-Lease from the United States terminates.
 September – J. B. Priestley's drama An Inspector Calls is premièred (in Russian translation) in Leningrad.
 2 October – Piccadilly Circus tube station becomes the first to be lit by fluorescent light.
 24 October – the British government signs the United Nations Charter.
 14 November – Harold Macmillan begins his third term as a Conservative MP, after winning the by-election in Bromley, Kent.
 15 November – Gainsborough Pictures releases the period melodrama The Wicked Lady starring Margaret Lockwood, Patricia Roc and James Mason.
 26 November – J. Arthur Rank releases David Lean's film of Noël Coward's Brief Encounter starring Celia Johnson and Trevor Howard.
 28 November – British fascist John Amery pleads guilty to treason and is immediately sentenced to hang.
 December
 Alexander Fleming and Ernst Boris Chain win the Nobel Prize in Physiology or Medicine jointly with Howard Florey "for the discovery of penicillin and its curative effect in various infectious diseases".
 John Maynard Keynes secures a fifty-year $3,750,000,000 Anglo-American loan for the Government from the United States at 2%, effective from 1946.
 Bernard Lovell establishes the Jodrell Bank Observatory in Cheshire.
 10 December – forced repatriation of Liverpool Chinese seamen begins.
 31 December – Britain receives its first shipment of bananas since the beginning of the war.
 Undated – the grammar school at Windermere reorganises itself to become Britain's first comprehensive school.

Publications
 Rev. W. V. Awdry's children's book The Three Railway Engines, first of The Railway Series.
 Agatha Christie's novel Sparkling Cyanide.
 E. B. Ford's book Butterflies, first of the New Naturalist series.
 Winston Graham's novel Ross Poldark, first of the Poldark Novels.
 Henry Green's novel Loving.
 C. S. Lewis' novel That Hideous Strength.
 Nancy Mitford's novel The Pursuit of Love.
 George Orwell's novel Animal Farm.
 Karl Popper's book The Open Society and its Enemies.
 Bertrand Russell's book History of Western Philosophy.
 Evelyn Waugh's novel Brideshead Revisited

Births
 3 January – David Starkey, English historian
 6 January – Barry John, Welsh rugby union footballer
 10 January
 Jennifer Moss, actress (died 2006)
 Rod Stewart, rock singer
 15 January – Princess Michael of Kent, German-born wife of Prince Michael of Kent
 18 January – Rocco Forte, hotelier
 21 January – Martin Shaw, English actor
 25 January – Dave Walker, rock musician
 26 January
 Jacqueline du Pré, English cellist (died 1987)
 Ashley Hutchings, folk rock musician
 23 January – Richard Dearlove, English intelligence officer
 29 January – Jim Nicholson, Northern Irish Unionist politician and MEP for Northern Ireland
 30 January – Mike Kenny, paralympian swimmer
 31 January – Brenda Hale, Baroness Hale of Richmond, President of the Supreme Court of the United Kingdom
 3 February – Roy 'Chubby' Brown, stand-up comedian
 5 February – Charlotte Rampling, English actress
 7 February – Gerald Davies, Welsh rugby player
 13 February 
 Keith Nichols, jazz musician and manager (died 2021)
 Simon Schama, historian
 15 February – John Helliwell, English saxophonist and keyboard player 
 16 February – Jeremy Bulloch, actor (died 2020)
 20 February – Alan Hull, English folk rock singer-songwriter (died 1995)
 25 February – Elkie Brooks, English singer
 26 February – Michael Marmot, English epidemiologist
 22 March – Peter Williams, English physicist and academic
 30 March – Eric Clapton, English rock guitarist
 2 April – Roger Bootle-Wilbraham, 7th Baron Skelmersdale, politician (died 2018)
 6 April – Rodney Bickerstaffe, English trade union leader (died 2017)
 7 April – Gerry Cottle, English circus owner (died 2021)
 14 April – Ritchie Blackmore, English rock guitarist (Deep Purple)
 20 April – Alistair Cooke, Baron Lexden, historian and author
 21 April
Ian Bruce, author and academic
Diana Darvey, actress, singer and dancer (died 2000)
 29 April – Hugh Hopper, English rock guitarist (died 2009)
 6 May – Hilary Dwyer, actress, businessperson and film producer (died 2020) 
 9 May
Peter J. Hammond, academic economist
Nicholas Wilson, Lord Wilson of Culworth, lawyer and judge
 12 May
 Alan Ball Jr., England footballer (died 2007)
 Nicky Henson, actor (died 2019)
 14 May – George Nicholls, English rugby league footballer
 16 May – Nicky Chinn, English songwriter (Sweet and Suzi Quatro)
 19 May 
 Diana Maddock, Baroness Maddock, politician (died 2020)
 Pete Townshend, English rock guitarist and singer-songwriter (The Who)
 29 May – Gary Brooker, English rock keyboardist and singer-songwriter (Procol Harum) (died 2022)
 1 June – Ray Harford, footballer and manager (died 2003)
 2 June – Lord David Dundas, musician and actor
 3 June
Brian Barnes, golfer (died 2019)
John Derbyshire, English-American journalist and author
Roger Lane-Nott, admiral
 8 June 
 Len Badger, footballer (died 2021)
 Anthony Bagnall, air chief marshal
 12 June – Pat Jennings, Northern Irish football goalkeeper
 14 June – Rod Argent, singer and keyboardist 
 15 June – Nicola Pagett, actress (died 2021)
 17 June – Ken Livingstone, politician
 19 June – John Hind, English bishop and theologian
 28 June – David Knights, English rock guitarist (Procol Harum)
 3 July – Iain MacDonald-Smith, English racing yachtsman
 4 July – David McWilliams, Northern Irish singer-songwriter (died 2002)
 7 July – Michael Ancram, Conservative politician and MP for Devizes
 10 July 
 John Motson, football commentator (died 2023)
 Virginia Wade, tennis player
 16 July – Barry Dudleston, English first-class cricketer and umpire
 19 July – Richard Henderson, Scottish molecular biologist, Nobel Prize laureate
 20 July – John Lodge, English rock singer/songwriter (The Moody Blues)
 21 July
 Wendy Cope, English poet
 John Lowe, English darts player
 24 July - Martin Edwards, businessman
 26 July
 Suzanna Leigh, actress (died 2017)
 Helen Mirren, actress
 1 August – Laila Morse, English television actress
 5 August – Martin Lambie-Nairn, production designer (died 2020)
 6 August – Ron Jones, television director (died 1993)
 8 August – Tom O'Carroll, paedophilia advocate
 9 August – Posy Simmonds, English cartoonist and illustrator
 13 August 
 Robin Jackman, cricketer (died 2020)
 Howard Marks ("Mr Nice"), Welsh cannabis smuggler, writer and campaigner (died 2016)
 14 August – Jennifer d'Abo, entrepreneur (died 2003)
 19 August – Ian Gillan, English hard rock singer (Deep Purple)
 24 August – Ken Hensley, singer-songwriter (Uriah Heep) (died 2020)
 31 August – Van Morrison, Northern Irish singer-songwriter
 8 September – Kelly Groucutt, English rock guitarist (Electric Light Orchestra) (died 2009)
 14 September – Martin Tyler, sports broadcaster
 18 September – John McAfee, British-American computer programmer and businessman (died 2021)
 21 September – Shaw Clifton, General of The Salvation Army
 24 September – John Rutter, choral composer
 26 September – Bryan Ferry, pop rock singer and musician
 27 September – Bob Spiers, television director (died 2008)
 5 October 
 Brian Connolly, Scottish musician (died 1997)
 Geoff Leigh, English saxophonist and flute player 
 15 October – Dave Hill, actor
 19 October – Angus Deaton, Scottish-born economist, Nobel Prize laureate
 23 October 
 Hugh Fraser, actor
 Maggi Hambling, painter and sculptor
 31 October – Al Jones, folk singer (died 2008)
 14 November – Louise Ellman, academic and politician
 17 November – Gordon Phillips, English football player and manager (died 2018)
 25 November - Bobby Knutt, English actor and comedian (died 2017)
 26 November – John McVie, English rock bass guitarist (Fleetwood Mac)
 30 November
 Hilary Armstrong, politician
 Mary Millington, pornographic film actress (suicide 1979)
 7 December – Clive Russell, English actor
 16 December – Tony Hicks, guitarist and singer (The Hollies)
 17 December 
 David Mallet, director
 Jacqueline Wilson, English children's writer
 19 December – Ron Hunt, English footballer (died 2018)
 24 December – Ian "Lemmy" Kilminster, bassist and singer (Motörhead) (died 2015)
 25 December
 Eve Pollard, newspaper editor
 Noel Redding, rock musician (died 2003)
 30 December – Davy Jones, English-born pop singer and actor (died 2012)

Deaths
 2 January – Sir Bertram Ramsay, admiral; killed on active service (born 1883)
 6 January – Herbert Lumsden, general; killed in action (born 1897) 
 9 January – Dennis O'Neill, Welsh child manslaughter victim (born 1932)
 30 January – William Goodenough, admiral (born 1867)
 21 January – Archibald Murray, Army general (born 1860)
 31 January – Les Adams, rugby league player (born 1909)
 21 February – Eric Liddell, athlete and missionary; died in Weixian Internment Camp (born 1902)
 5 March – Albert Richards, war artist; killed on active service (born 1919)
 7 March – Daniel Everett, RAF pilot; killed in action (born 1920)
 8 March – Frederick Bligh Bond, architect, archaeologist and psychical researcher (born 1864)
 20 March – Lord Alfred Douglas, poet and former lover of Oscar Wilde (born 1870)
 23 March – Sir Napier Shaw, meteorologist (born 1854)
 26 March – David Lloyd George, former Prime Minister (born 1863)
 29 March – Jack Agazarian, spy; executed (born 1916)
 7 April – Elizabeth Bibesco, writer and socialite (born 1897) 
 11 April – Cecil Griffiths, athlete, winner of gold medal in 4 × 400 m relay at the 1920 Summer Olympics (born 1901)
 18 April – Sir John Ambrose Fleming, electrical engineer and physicist (born 1849)
 3 May – Herbert Farjeon, man of the theatre (born 1887)
 15 May
Kenneth J. Alford (Frederick J. Ricketts), composer of military marches (born 1881)
Charles Williams, author (born 1886)
 27 July – Alfred Dobbs, politician (born 1882)
 6 September – Maximilian von Herff, Waffen-SS officer and Knight's Cross recipient (born 1893 in Germany)
 18 September – C. H. Middleton, gardening broadcaster (born 1886)
 22 September – Thomas Burke, fiction writer (born 1886)
 31 October
Henry Ainley, actor (born 1879)
Alfred Edward Taylor, philosopher (born 1869)
 20 November – Francis William Aston, chemist, Nobel Prize laureate (born 1877)
 4 December – Arthur Morrison, writer (born 1863)
 5 December – Cosmo Gordon Lang, former archbishop of Canterbury (born 1864)
 14 December – Princess Maud, Countess of Southesk, granddaughter of Edward VII (born 1893)
 26 December 
 Roger Keyes, 1st Baron Keyes, admiral (born 1872)
 Charlie Trigg, jockey (born 1881)

See also
 List of British films of 1945
 Military history of the United Kingdom during World War II

References

 
Years of the 20th century in the United Kingdom